Sitiveni Moceidreke (born 27 November 1994) is a Fiji international rugby league footballer who plays as a  and  for the London Broncos in the RFL Championship. 

He has previously played for the South Sydney Rabbitohs in the NRL.

Background
Born in Sydney, Australia, Moceidreke is of Fijian descent. He played his junior rugby league for Hurstville United, before being signed by the St. George Illawarra Dragons. His younger brother, Laitia, is a professional rugby league player for the North Queensland Cowboys.

Playing career

Early career
In 2012, Moceidreke played for St George Dragons in the SG Ball competition. In 2013 and 2014, Moceidreke moved up to St George Illawarra's NYC team. He then signed with the Illawarra Cutters for the 2015 season. In 2016, he signed with the North Sydney Bears. In the same year, Moceidreke played for Fiji against Papua New Guinea in the 2016 Melanesian Cup, playing at five-eighth. Later in the year, he again played for Fiji against Samoa, playing at fullback.  Moceidreke continued to be a mainstay of The North Sydney team in 2016 making a total of 21 appearances for the season.

2017
Moceidreke began the 2017 playing for the North Sydney Bears in the Intrust Super Premiership NSW. After an impressive performance in the ISP round 2 match, scoring four tries, he was signed by the South Sydney Rabbitohs. On his NRL debut in the fourth round, he scored the only try for South Sydney in their 20–6 loss to the Sydney Roosters. Moceidreke was selected in the Fijian squad to play in the 2017 Rugby League World Cup. On 15 November 2017, it was revealed that Moceidreke had signed a deal with Canberra Raiders feeder club side The Mount Pritchard Mounties for The 2018 season as part of an opportunity to get a trial and train contract for the NRL squad.

2018
Moceidreke made 19 appearances for Mounties scoring 9 tries and kicking 52 goals finishing with a total of 140 points for the season.

2019
After being released by Canberra, Moceidreke joined the Sunshine Coast in the Queensland Cup competition.

2020
Moceidreke played for the Melbourne Storm at the NRL Nines in Perth, Western Australia.

2021
In January 2021, he joined St. George in the NSW Cup.  He made his debut in round 1 of the competition against Newtown at Kogarah Oval.

2022
In January 2022, it was announced that he had signed for the London Broncos in the Championship.

References

External links
2017 RLWC profile
Fiji profile

1994 births
Living people
Australian people of Fijian descent
Australian rugby league players
Fiji national rugby league team players
London Broncos players
North Sydney Bears NSW Cup players
Rugby league centres
Rugby league players from Sydney
South Sydney Rabbitohs players